Ehud Rassabi (born 30 July 1953) is a former Israeli politician who served as a member of the Knesset for Shinui between 2003 and 2006.

Biography
Born in Tel Aviv, Rassabi gained Accountant Certification from Tel Aviv University, and worked in accountancy.

He joined Shinui in 1985, and for the 1999 elections  was placed eighth on the Shinui list, but missed out on a seat when they won only six mandates. For the 2003 elections he was placed 11th on the party's list, and entered the Knesset when the party won 15 seats. During his first term, he chaired the Chairman, Subcommittee for Taxes and Hi-Tech.

Following a split in the party in January 2006, Rassabi and Ilan Leibovitch were left as the only two sitting MKs in Shinui. He was placed second on the party's list for the 2006 elections, but lost his seat when the party failed to cross the electoral threshold.

Honours
 Order of the Rising Sun, 3rd Class, Gold Rays with Neck Ribbon (2018)

References

External links

1953 births
Living people
Members of the 16th Knesset (2003–2006)
People from Tel Aviv
Shinui politicians
Tel Aviv University alumni
Recipients of the Order of the Rising Sun, 3rd class